The North Island Main Trunk (NIMT) is the main railway line in the North Island of New Zealand, connecting the capital city Wellington with the country's largest city, Auckland.

Most of the NIMT is single track with frequent passing loops, but has double track -

 between Hamilton and Te Kauwhata (except for the single-track Waikato River Bridge at Ngāruawāhia), and 
 between Meremere and Auckland Britomart.

The first section of what became the NIMT opened in 1873 in Auckland. Construction at the Wellington end began in 1885. The line was completed in 1908 and was fully operational by 1909. It is credited for having been an economic lifeline, and for having opened up the centre of the North Island to European settlement and investment. In the early days, a passenger journey between Wellington and Auckland could take more than 20 hours; today, it takes approximately 11 hours.

The NIMT has been described as an "engineering miracle", with numerous engineering feats such as viaducts, tunnels and a spiral built to overcome large elevation differences with grades suitable for steam engines, the ruling gradient being 1 in 50.

History

Construction
When the first sections of the NIMT were built, there was great uncertainty as to even the route in Waikato, with Cambridge, Kihikihi, Te Awamutu and Alexandra considered as possible destinations in Waikato. The central section was gradually extended to meet up in 1909, 23 years after the last of the northern and southern sections of NIMT had been opened.

Auckland to Te Awamutu
Auckland's first railway was the  line between Point Britomart and Onehunga via Penrose, opened in 1873. The section from Penrose to Onehunga is now called the Onehunga Branch. The line was later continued south from Penrose into the Waikato. To support the Invasion of the Waikato, a  tramway was built from Maungatāwhiri to Meremere in 1864, with a first sod event near Koheroa on Tuesday, 29 March 1864 by Auckland's Chief Superintendent of Roads & Bridges, W R Collett. Turning of the first sod of the Auckland and Drury Railway took place in 1865, a year after the last major battle. It was extended to Frankton by December 1877, and to Te Awamutu in 1880. An economic downturn stalled construction for the next five years, and Te Awamutu remained the railhead. There were also negotiations with local Māori, and the King Country was not accessible to Europeans until 1883.

Wellington to Marton

The Wellington-Longburn (near Palmerston North) section was constructed between 1881 and 1886 by the Wellington and Manawatu Railway Company (WMR). The company was acquired by the government and merged with the New Zealand Railways Department in 1908.

The Longburn to Marton section had been opened on 18 April 1878, as part of the line linking the ports of Foxton and Whanganui.

Central North Island

In 1882, the Whitaker Ministry passed the North Island Main Trunk Railway Loan Act, to expedite construction of the North Island Main Trunk south of Te Awamutu by authorising the overseas borrowing of a million pounds (probably in London) for the work. From Te Awamutu, it was proposed that the line be built via Taupo or via Taumarunui, the eventual route. Four options were considered before the Minister of Public Works decided on the present route in 1884, but, when it was realised just how difficult that route was, further surveys considered two other options in 1888.

Construction of the final central section began on 15 April 1885, when paramount chief Wahanui of Ngāti Maniapoto turned the first sod outside Te Awamutu. It was 23 years before the two lines met, as the central section was difficult to survey and construct. The crossing of the North Island Volcanic Plateau with deep ravines required nine viaducts and the world-famous Raurimu Spiral.

Richard Seddon’s Liberal Government pledged in 1903 that the whole route would be open in 1908. In 1904, the railheads were still 146 km apart, and contracts for three massive viaducts (Makatote, Hapuawhenua and Taonui) were not let until 1905. The government committed 2500 workmen, and in 1907, the Minister of  Public Works William Hall-Jones instigated a night shift (under kerosene lamps). 
By the beginning of 1908, there was a  gap between Erua and Ohakune, with a connecting horse-drawn coach service. From Ohakune south to Waiouru, the Public Works Department operated the train, as this section of 27 km (17 mi) had not yet been handed over to the Railways Department.

Opening
The gap was closed on 7 August 1908 for the first through passenger train, the 11-car Parliamentary Special carrying the Prime Minister Sir Joseph Ward and other parliamentarians north to see the American Great White Fleet at Auckland. But much of the new section was temporary, with some cuttings north of Taonui having vertical batters and unballasted track from Horopito to Makatote. Ward drove the last spike on 6 November 1908, and the 'Last Spike' monument is at Manganui-o-te-Ao , near Pokaka. A two-day NIMT service started on 9 November, with an overnight stop at Ohakune.

On 14 February 1909, the first NIMT express left Auckland for Wellington, an overnight trip scheduled to take 19 hours 15 minutes, with a sleeping car, day cars with reclining seats, and postal/parcels vans. The dining car went on the north express from Wellington to Ohakune, then transferred to the southbound express, so avoiding the heavy gradients of the central section.

Upgrades and deviations

Signals and track
The rails and signalling have been upgraded over the years, and many sections of the line have been deviated: The original 1870s Vogel Era track had rails of 40 lb/yd (19.9 kg/m), some were iron not steel; later rails were 53 lb/yd (26.3 kg/m); and from 1901 70 lb/yd (34.8 kg/m), e.g. between Taumarunui and Taihape for the heavy X class locomotives used on the central mountainous section from 1908. Some 10 bridges between Frankton and Taumarunui had to be strengthened, and in 1914 there was still 129 km (80 mi) of 53 lb/yd rail to be replaced. In the 1930s 85 lb/yd (42.2 kg/m) was adopted, then 91 lb/yd (45.1 kg/m), and from 1974 100 lb/yd (50 kg/m).

Signalling on the single-track sections (most of the line) was controlled by Tyer's Electric Train Tablet No 7 system; with each of the stations for the 94 tablet sections staffed by three tablet porters each working a 56-hour week for continuous coverage; hence each station required at least four houses for the stationmaster and three porters. Pierre noticed that with CTC station buildings and even platforms had been removed as there were no longer any staffed stations between Ohakune and National Park. The Train Control system introduced from 1928 to 1932 supplemented the tablet system by operators at the four sections (Auckland, Frankton, Te Kuiti, Ohakune, Marton and Wellington) to expedite operation of trains over several tablet sections; the 1925 Fay-Raven report urged its adoption because of the fitful progress of mixed trains, with locomotives often kept waiting. From 1938 to 1966 Centralised Traffic Control (CTC) gradually replaced the tablet system on the NIMT. In 1957 when the installation of CTC over the remaining 354 km commenced, it was estimated that using CTC over the 330 km Taumarunui to Otaki section with control centres at Ohakune (which shifted to Taumarunui in 1977), Taihape and Palmerston North would replace 74 men in traffic working duties. The last section converted was Piriaka-Owhango.

Under Thomas Ronayne, the New Zealand Railways Department general manager from 1895 to 1913, the section south to Parnell was duplicated and improvements made to the worst gradients and tight curves between Auckland and Mercer. Under his successor E. H. Hiley the second Parnell Tunnel with two tracks and an easier gradient was completed in 1915–1916. On the Kakariki bank between Halcombe and Marton a deviation reduced the 1 in 53 grade to 1 in 70 in 1915. Similar work was done to ease the gradient to Greatford, on the other side of the Rangitīkei River, in 1939. A 1914 Act authorised spending on the Westfield Deviation, new stations at Auckland and Wellington, track doubling (Penrose-Papakura, Ohinewai-Huntly, Horotiu-Frankton, Newmarket-New Lynn), and grade easements from Penrose to Te Kuiti, but the war delayed most of these works for over a decade.

In 1927, automatic colour-light signalling was installed from Otahuhu to Mercer. By then, wartime shortages delayed further double-tracking. Pokeno to Mercer was doubled from 11 November 1951, Pukekohe to Pokeno 21 November 1954, Mercer to Amokura 1 July 1956 and Ohinewai to Te Kauwhata 14 December 1958. The  between Amokura and Te Kauwhata remain single track, as does Ngāruawāhia bridge. Doubling of the section south of Amokura is being investigated in a business case from July 2021.

Westfield deviation

In 1930, the Westfield deviation was opened, creating a new eastern route from Auckland to Westfield via Glen Innes and Hobsons Bay, running into the new Auckland railway station and providing better access to the Port of Auckland. The original section between Auckland and Westfield via Newmarket later ceased to be part of the NIMT: Auckland to Newmarket became the Auckland-Newmarket Line, and Newmarket to Westfield became part of the North Auckland Line (NAL) which runs between Whangarei and Westfield.

In the late 1930s, bridges replaced level crossings at Ohinewai, Taupiri and Hopuhopu.

Tawa flat deviation

The double track Tawa Flat deviation opened to goods trains on 22 July 1935 and to passenger trains on 19 June 1937, bypassing the original single track WMR line between Wellington and Tawa. With a pair of tunnels under the Wellington hills, the deviation alleviated issues with more and heavier freight traffic on the steep and twisting original route where long sections at 1 in 60 gradient required banker engines. The Wellington to Johnsonville section of the original line was retained as the Johnsonville Line and the Johnsonville to Tawa section closed.

The sections from Plimmerton to South Junction, north of Pukerua Bay and Muri, and North Junction to Paekakariki were duplicated in 1940. From 24 July 1940 electrification at 1500 V DC of the southern section of the NIMT from Wellington to Paekakariki was completed. The Tawa Flat deviation has a long tunnel (Tawa No 2) not suitable for steam operation because of excessive smoke (although steam trains were temporarily operated in the new deviation from 1935). A Centralised Train Control (CTC) system was installed in 1940, so that new signal boxes were not required and five stations between Tawa and Pukerua Bay no longer had to be continually staffed for Tablet operation; see Kapiti Line. Electrification eliminated the need to relieve the steep (1 in 57) gradients from Plimmerton to the Pukerua Bay summit by a deviation to the east and allowed more frequent suburban passenger trains (and allowed suburban electric multiple units to run on this section from September 1949).

The difficult section down the Paekakariki Escarpment from Pukerua Bay to Paekakariki with five tunnels between South and North Junctions remains single track. Duplication from Tawa to Porirua opened on 15 December 1957, from Porirua to Paremata on 7 November 1960, and Paremata to Plimmerton on 16 October 1961. The section between Porirua and Plimmerton was straightened in conjunction with the duplication by reclaiming land along the eastern shore of Porirua Harbour.

In 1967, the floors of the tunnels on the former WMR section between Paekakariki and Pukerua Bay were lowered to enable the DA class locomotives to travel all the way to Wellington.

Milson deviation

Between 1964 and 1966, a deviation away from the centre of Palmerston North via the Milson deviation on the edge of the city.

Mangaweka deviation

Between 1973 and 1981, the major Mangaweka deviation in the central section between Mangaweka and Utiku was built, with three viaducts, all over 70m tall, crossing the Rangitīkei and Kawhatau rivers. The viaducts were at the end of their economic lives. The deviation removed a number of tunnels, many of which were built in unstable country, and eliminated a number of steep gradients.

Hapuawhenua deviation
The central section from Te Rapa near Hamilton to Palmerston North was electrified between 1984 and 1988 as part of the Think Big government energy program. Some tunnels were opened out or bypassed by deviations while in others clearances were increased, and curves eased. The section between Ohakune and Horopito was realigned with three viaducts replaced to handle higher loads and speeds. The most notable bridge replaced was the curved metal viaduct at Hapuawhenua by a modern concrete structure, though the original has been restored as a tourist attraction.

Recent upgrades
In 2009–10, the 1.5 km section of line between Wellington Junction and Distant Junction was rebuilt from double track to triple track, to ease peak-time congestion.

In February 2011, duplication between Paekakariki and Waikanae was completed as part of the upgrade and expansion of the Wellington suburban network; see Kapiti Line for more information.

In 2012–13, four bridges near Rangiriri between Auckland and Hamilton were replaced. The bridges were all over 100 years old with steel spans and timber piers, and were replaced by modern low-maintenance concrete ballast deck bridges.

The construction of the Peka Peka to Otaki section of the Kapiti Expressway required 1.3 km of the NIMT immediately north of Otaki station to be realigned. Construction began in 2017, and trains were switched onto the new alignment over the 2019 Easter long weekend (19–22 April).

In the Auckland area, a  third main line between Wiri and Westfield (or Papakura) is under construction; this will allow freight (or other) trains to bypass stationary passenger trains.

Electrification 

There are three independent sections of the NIMT which are electrified: Auckland's urban network and the central section (25 kV AC) from Palmerston North – Te Rapa (north of Hamilton) at (25 kV AC). Wellington's urban network is electrified at (1500 V DC); as formerly used in other sections of the New Zealand network. In Wellington the operating voltage has been increased to 1600 V DC since the full introduction of the Matangi EMU, to increase the power available.
 
Electrification of the NIMT was mooted by electrical engineer Evan Parry in the first volume of the New Zealand Journal of Science and Technology in November 1918. In light of a national coal shortage following World War I, Parry argued that the network was under great strain due to ever-increasing volumes of freight, and the use of steam traction was partly to blame. Parry also noted that there was great potential for cheap hydro-electricity generation in the central North Island to power electrification.

The first part of the NIMT to be electrified was the Wellington–Paekakariki section via the Tawa Flat deviation that was completed on 24 July 1940. This was largely to prevent smoke nuisance in the 4.3 km No. 2 tunnel, and to provide for banking on the Paekakariki to Pukerua Bay section. Electric traction in this section is now used only by Transdev Wellington for Metlink suburban passenger services on the Kapiti Line, and was extended to Paraparaumu on 7 May 1983 and Waikanae on 20 February 2011. Funded by the Greater Wellington Regional Council, the extension to Waikanae coincided with the delivery of new FP class Matangi electric multiple units.

Following the Second World War railway services suffered due to skill and coal shortages. Skilled staff sought employment opportunities elsewhere in the economy. From 1948 to 1951 the General Manager of the Railways Department, Francis William Aickin, advocated electrification of the entire line, despite protests from his engineering staff. Aickin had previously been Staff Superintendent and Chief Legal Advisor to the Department and considered using diesel locomotives for trains on the NIMT to be too expensive. He turned his attention to electrification, mainly because he saw that it could relieve the coal situation and prevent high expenditure on imported fuels.

He commissioned a study into electrification, which concluded that a low-frequency AC system could be cheaper than 1500 V DC, the system in use in Wellington. Aickin sent a technical mission of four senior officers overseas in March 1949 and travelled overseas himself to negotiate a tentative contract with a British construction company. The Chief Mechanical Engineer and Chief Accountant specified and costed the system and Aickin was able to complete a substantial report justifying the NIMT electrification and submit it to the Government.

Officers from New Zealand Treasury and the Ministry of Works and two experts from Sweden (Thelander and Edenius) commented on the proposal and in December 1950 the Government granted approval in principle and agreed to appoint Thelander as a consultant. Aickin later fell out with the then National Government and retired as General Manager in July 1951. With the change in regime, the electrification proposal disappeared.

A key assumption of Aickin's report was that traffic on the NIMT would grow by 50% from 1948 to 1961. Since a diesel-electric locomotive is a travelling power station, the savings through electrification compared to diesel could be regarded as the difference between the cost of buying bulk electrical energy generated substantially from New Zealand resources and the cost of generating electricity in a small plant using imported diesel fuel.

The Royal Commission on Railways created following Aickin's tenure rejected the report's findings. Aickin's successor, H.C. Lusty, revised the tentative contract with English Electric to specify DF class diesel-electric locomotives. They were later found to be unreliable, and only ten were supplied. 42 DG class locomotives were supplied instead for secondary lines. For main lines including the NIMT, the General Motors G12 export models were ordered, becoming the DA class.

The  section between Palmerston North and Hamilton was electrified at 25 kV 50 Hz AC, opened on 24 June 1988 as one of the Muldoon National Government's "Think Big" energy development projects. An overall cost in excess of $100 million had been projected, with some 40% being for the locomotives, but the final cost was about $250 million. The economics of the project was greatly undermined by the fall of the price of oil in the 1980s and the deregulation of land transport, which removed the long-distance monopoly NZR held when the cost-benefit report was written.

The electrification of the section, which had its genesis in a study group set up in June 1974 to report on measures to be taken to cope with increasing rail traffic volumes, received approval in 1980. This led to a technical study carried out with assistance from the Japanese Railway Technical Research Institute. The report stated that track capacity would be increased by electrification because such traction is faster and able to move more freight at once. Less fuel would be needed and employing regenerative braking in electric locomotives lowers the fuel consumption further.

Electrification's advantages were reflected in the economic evaluation in the report, which showed a rate of return of 18%. Sensitivity analysis showed that this high rate of return gave the project robustness against lower traffic volumes than expected (the return remained positive even if traffic fell), against significant increases in construction cost, and against lower than expected rises in the diesel fuel price.

Part of the project included replacing the copper wire communications system with a new fibre optic communications cable (due to interference caused by AC power with the DC copper wire system) between Wellington and Auckland. In 1994 New Zealand Rail Limited sold the cable to Clear Communications for telephone traffic, leasing part of it back for signalling.

Proposals to electrify the Auckland suburban rail network dated back to the 1960s, they mainly coincided with proposals to electrify the NIMT in its entirety. In 2005 the central government decided to implement a proposal to electrify the urban network at 25 kV AC, the same system as on the central NIMT. This included  of the NIMT itself, from Britomart to just south of Papakura. Work on electrification of the Auckland network began in 2010. The first revenue electric services using AM class EMUs commenced on 28 April 2014 between Britomart and Onehunga on the Onehunga Line. The electrification project on the Auckland network, including the Auckland-Papakura section of the NIMT, was completed in July 2015, with all suburban services being electric. A diesel shuttle service runs on the non-electrified Pukekohe-Papakura section.

Future 
Electrification may be extended south as the Auckland suburban system expands, but this will depend on further government funding. In February 2008 former Auckland Regional Council Chairman Mike Lee suggested the initial electrification might be extended to Pukekohe, leaving a  gap to Te Rapa. In 2012, in response to public submissions, the board of Auckland Transport decided to include an investigation into electrifying to Pukekohe to its 10-year programme. ATAP, Auckland's 2018–2028 plan provides for Pukekohe electrification, a third line from Westfield to Wiri and further new electric trains. In 2020 the government announced funding for electrification from Papakura to Pukekohe.

A paper written in 2008 for then railway infrastructure owner ONTRACK investigated the possibility of electrifying the remaining Papakura-Te Rapa gap between the Auckland urban system's terminus at Papakura on the NIMT and the central NIMT system, along with electrification of the East Coast Main Trunk to Tauranga. The report put the total cost of electrification at $860 million, with $433 million for the Papakura-Te Rapa section. It concluded that money would be better spent on grade and curvature easements, removing speed restrictions and increasing the length of passing loops.

In Wellington, there is an  gap from Waikanae to the central NIMT electrification at Palmerston North. As the two electrification systems are different, multi-current locomotives or multiple units would be required for through electric working. Replacement rolling stock for Wellington, Wairarapa and Palmerston North and extending electrification north of Waikanae to Levin and beyond are being investigated in a business case from July 2021. KiwiRail has indicated it has no plans to upgrade the Wellington electrification from 1500 V DC to 25 kV AC, but intends to use dual-voltage locomotives. It has also indicated any extension north of Waikanae station would be at 25 kV AC, with through workings from Wellington to Ōtaki and further north requiring multi-current rolling stock; this would also allow the 25 kV AC section to be fed from the existing 220 kV substation at Paraparaumu, avoided the cost of building a new substation.

On 21 December 2016, KiwiRail announced their plan to withdraw from service, over a two-year period, the EF class electric locomotives (the only electric rolling stock working the central electrified section) without replacing them. The reasons given for the decision included the fact that the EFs are now close to their end of life (approximately 30 years old) and suffer from frequent breakdowns (on average every  which is well below the expected breakdown-free service interval of ) and that having to change from a diesel locomotive to an electric one and back again at each end of the electrified section is labour-intensive, time-consuming and adds to costs. KiwiRail did not intend to de-electrify the section but would maintain it so that electric rolling stock could be reintroduced in the future.

On 30 October 2018, the Government announced that it is retaining the EF class electric locomotives, to help meet its long term emissions goals and boost the economy. The 15 remaining EF class locomotives will be refurbished by KiwiRail and will continue to run between Hamilton and Palmerston North.

In 2021 the "North Island Electrification Expansion Study" was published by KiwiRail, Beca and Systra following a government grant for a business case. The report recommended electrification from Waikanae to Palmerston North be 25kV AC, with a change over just north of Waikanae to allow multi-current electric locomotives to switch between AC and DC traction. The cost of electrifying this section of the NIMT was at an expected estimate of $339m, with the Pukekohe to Te Rapa section estimated at $430m.

Centennial
On 6 August 2008, at 9am, a train (which included 100-year-old carriage AA1013, restored by the Mainline Steam Trust) departed Wellington in a re-enactment of 7 August 1908 Parliamentary Special carrying the Prime Minister Sir Joseph Ward to Auckland, stopping overnight at Taihape and Taumarunui before continuing to Auckland. Tickets were by invitation only.

A series of stamps was issued to commemorate the centennial, see Stamps:
 50c – Last Spike Ceremony Manganui-o-te-ao – a photo of actual event
 $1.00 – Taumarunui, 1958 – steam locomotive KA 947 pulling into the old railway station.
 $1.50 – Makatote Viaduct, 1963.
 $2.00 – Raurimu Spiral, 1964.
 $2.50 – The Overlander, Hapuawhenua Viaduct, 2003.

Infrastructure 
The NIMT has been described as an "engineering miracle", with numerous engineering feats especially along the Rangitīkei River and on the North Island Volcanic Plateau. This included the building of the famous Raurimu Spiral to allow trains to ascend the steep grade from the Whanganui River valley to the North Island Volcanic Plateau.

The NIMT includes 352 bridges and 14 tunnels. The major viaducts include three (North Rangitīkei, South Rangitīkei and Kawhatau) opened in 1981 for the Mangaweka deviation. There are smaller viaducts at Taonui north of Ohakune, and Manganui-o-te-Ao and Mangaturuturu.

The heights and lengths of the main viaducts are:

Rolling stock
Due to its high volume and high value of traffic to NZR and the steep grades in the central section, the NIMT has seen the use of the most powerful locomotives in New Zealand.

When the NIMT opened in 1909, the powerful 4-8-2 X class was introduced to handle heavy traffic over the mountainous central North Island section.
Three G class Garratt-type locomotives were introduced in 1928, but these were not as effective as anticipated. In 1932, the 4-8-4 K class was introduced, and later improved in 1939 with the KA class.

The introduction of the DF class in 1954 began the end of the steam era, and in 1955, with the introduction of the DA class locomotive, major withdrawals of steam locomotives began. 1972 saw the introduction of DX class locomotives and the Silver Fern railcars; the latter remaining in service between Auckland and Wellington until 1991.

With electrification and the introduction of the EF class electric locomotives in the late 1980s, the DX class was mainly reassigned to other areas of the network, including hauling coal on the Midland Line in the South Island. Since then, services between Te Rapa and Palmerston North have been worked mainly by the electrics, although some services are still diesel-operated, such as those originating from or terminating on other lines, or originating from within the central section, like the paper pulp freight trains from Karioi.

As of March 2021, regular rolling stock on the NIMT include:

 DC class – all sections
 DFT class – all sections
 DL class – all sections
 EF class – Palmerston North to Te Rapa

Connecting lines

Notable connecting tramways and other lines

Passenger services

Long-distance

From opening, there have been regular passenger services between Wellington and Auckland. The daily "Express" left earlier in the evening, followed by the "Limited", which had fewer stops for passengers.

Between 1963 and 1968, daytime trains were called the Scenic Daylight. In 1968, a Drewery NZR RM class articulated 88-seater railcar was refurbished and repainted in a distinctive blue-and-white scheme that led to it being nicknamed the Blue Streak. It initially operated an unsuccessful service between Hamilton and Auckland in early 1968, and was transferred to the Auckland-Wellington run on 23 September 1968. Note that all self-propelled passenger railcar classes in New Zealand are generically classed 'RM'.

In 1971, NZR introduced the Silver Star, a luxury sleeper train. The service was not economically viable and was withdrawn in 1979. Much more successful was the Silver Fern, a daytime railcar service, introduced in 1972 to replace the "Blue Streak". This service was withdrawn in 1991 and replaced by The Overlander.

In conjunction with the introduction of the carriage train Overlander service, the Silver Fern railcars were redeployed to start new services between Tauranga and Auckland – Kaimai Express, and Auckland and Rotorua – Geyserland Express, in 1991. In 2000 a new commuter service called the Waikato Connection was introduced between Hamilton and Auckland and ran in conjunction with the services to Tauranga and Rotorua until all three services were cancelled in 2001.

On 25 July 2006, Toll NZ announced that the Overlander would cease at the end of September 2006, but on 28 September 2006, the train's continuation on a limited timetable was announced. It ran daily during the summer months and thrice-weekly for the balance of the year.

In 2012, KiwiRail announced the Overlander would be replaced by the Northern Explorer, with modern New Zealand-built AK class carriages to provide a premium tourist train on a quicker timetable with fewer stops. It commenced on Monday 25 June 2012, and consisted of one train running from Auckland-to-Wellington on Mondays, Thursdays and Saturdays, and Wellington-to-Auckland on Wednesdays, Fridays and Sundays. It had fewer stops than the Overlander, stopping only at Papakura, Hamilton, Ōtorohanga, National Park, Ohakune, Palmerston North and Paraparaumu. The Northern Explorer scheduled passenger service was suspended in December 2021. The service was reinstated from 25 September 2022.

In 2021 a new commuter service between Hamilton and Auckland was introduced, named Te Huia.

The Capital Connection commuter train operates between Palmerston North and Wellington.

Both KiwiRail and private enthusiast operators such as the Railway Enthusiasts Society, Mainline Steam and Steam Incorporated operate charter trains.

Auckland suburban

Suburban trains run on the NIMT at regular intervals as follows:

Eastern Line (Manukau to Britomart via Glen Innes) trains run on the NIMT between Puhinui and Britomart.

Southern Line (Papakura to Britomart via Otahuhu and Newmarket) trains run on the NIMT from Papakura to Westfield Junction. They then run on the North Auckland Line to Newmarket, and the Newmarket Line to the vicinity of Quay Park, where they rejoin the NIMT only for the short section (about 500 metres) into Britomart. A diesel train shuttle service runs on the NIMT between Pukekohe and Papakura.

Onehunga Line and Western Line trains use the NIMT only for the short section (about 500 metres) from the vicinity of Quay Park into Britomart.

Wellington suburban

Wellington's Metlink suburban network, operated by Transdev Wellington, includes the southern portion of the NIMT between Wellington and Waikanae as the Kapiti Line.

Stations

Record runs
Record runs from Auckland to Wellington were the 1960 Moohan Rocket (train) of 11 hours 34 minutes in 1960, and the Standard railcar time of 9 hours 26 minutes (running time 8 hours 42 minutes) in 1967.

See also 

 List of Auckland railway stations
 List of Wellington railway stations
 Hamilton-Auckland commuter rail proposals
North Island Main Trunk (1995) - film

References

Citations

Bibliography

Gallery

External links 
 1969 timetable
New Zealand Geographic - Riding the Long Steel Road - article on the NIMT
 A history of the NIMT & Overlander, with video & sound clips
 NZ Engineering Heritage NIMT page
 The Romance of the Rail by James Cowan c1928
 Maori station names on the NIMT
 
 

Railway lines in New Zealand
Historic Civil Engineering Landmarks
3 ft 6 in gauge railways in New Zealand
25 kV AC railway electrification